TLL may refer to:

 Lennart Meri Tallinn Airport (IATA airport code)
 Thesaurus Linguae Latinae
 The Learning Lab
 Tornado Low Level, a ZX Spectrum game